Samuel Paynter (1774 – July 24, 1844) was a wealthy landowner from St Issey in Cornwall. He made his fortune as a builder and contractor with his brother Francis Paynter (of Denmark Hill) at 64 Coleman Street and 57 Wood Street in the City of London (1807–12). He gained estates in Middlesex and Surrey and was High Sheriff of Surrey in 1839. He was also a Justice of the Peace in Surrey and Middlesex.

Family
His first wife was Ann Butler, daughter of William Butler. 
 William, born in 1799  
 Eliza, born in 1802. Married her cousin Rev Samuel Paynter of Stoke House. He was chaplain to the Marquess of Ailsa

His second wife was Mary Penn, daughter of Richard Penn, governor of Philadelphia. 
 No issue

Death

He died of paralysis on 24 July 1844, aged 70. His memorial in St Mary Magdalene, Richmond church is a tablet with two marble full length angels, by Edward Hodges Baily R.A., who was famous for sculpting Nelson on Nelson's column.

References

1774 births
1844 deaths
People from Cornwall
High Sheriffs of Surrey
Richmond, London